Antoon-Jozef Witteryck (6 June 1865 in Oostkamp – 3 July 1934 in Bruges) was a publisher and instructor from Belgium, one of the first Esperantists in this countryside.

Bibliography
Het Esperanto in tien lessen. 2a eld. Brugge: A.-J. Witteryck.
Conversations en quatre langues: English, Français, Nederlandsch, Esperanto. London 1906, 202 p.
Zakboekje van den Nederlandschen Esperantist. Brugge: W. 1908, 31 p. 14 cm.
Van Weyerbergh. Esperanto Gvidlibreto por turistoj en Brugo. 1910, 32 p. Redaktis W.
De waarheid over Esperanto en Ido = La vérité sur l’Esperanto et l’Ido. S.l.: s.i. 1913, 14, 14 p. 25 cm
Het Esperanto in tien lessen. 3a eld. Steenbrugge-bij-Brugge: De Lusthof.
Het Esperanto in tien lessen. 6a eld. Steenbrugge: De Lusthof.
Het Esperanto in tien lessen. Nieuwe uitg. [7a eld.] Steenbrugge-bij-Brugge: De  Lusthof.
Cours d’Esperanto. Grammaire Complète. Steenbrugge: De Lusthof. s.j., 30 p.
L’anglais usuel en 15 leçons.
L’anglais classique en 10 leçons.
Lectures anglaises (suivies de notes explicatives).
Het Engelsch voor het dagelijksch verkeer, in 15 lessen.
Klassiek Engelsch in 10 lessen.
Engelsche lezingen (met verklaringen) - 1ste deel.
Engelsche lezingen (met modellen van brieven) -2de deel
Flemish for Home Study, in 10 lessons (simple and comprehensive)

External links
 
 

1865 births
1934 deaths
Belgian non-fiction writers
Belgian Esperantists
People from Oostkamp
19th-century Belgian writers
20th-century Belgian writers
19th-century male writers
20th-century Belgian male writers
Male non-fiction writers